Gariv may refer to:
 Gariveh